Santiago Lanzuela Marina (27 September 1948 – 16 April 2020) was a Spanish economist and politician for the People's Party (PP), who served as President of the Government of Aragon, one of the Spanish regional administrations.

Life

Lanzuela was born in Teruel, Spain. An economist by profession, he was married with two children. In 1974 he became head of the office for Spanish co-operation with Nicaragua and then served as a director in the Spanish Employment Ministry from 1976 to 1981. In 1987, he was elected to the Aragonese Regional Assembly and, in 1989, the PP entered a coalition government with the Aragonese Party (PAR) with Lanzuela serving as Economics Minister until 1993. 

On 28 May 1995, the PP received the most votes in the Aragonese regional elections and as lead PP candidate, he was elected President of Aragon, defeating Ángela Abós Ballarín of the Spanish Socialist Workers' Party (PSOE). 

Although the PP increased their number of votes and seats in the 1999 elections, the PAR instead backed the candidate of the rival PSOE for President. At the 2000 General Election he was elected to the Spanish Congress, representing Teruel constituency and was re-elected at the subsequent elections in 2004 and 2008.

Death
Santiago Lanzuela died, aged 71, from COVID-19-related causes on 16 April 2020, in Madrid.

References

External links
Biography at Spanish Congress site.

1948 births
Presidents of the Government of Aragon
People from Teruel
Members of the 7th Congress of Deputies (Spain)
Members of the 8th Congress of Deputies (Spain)
Members of the 9th Congress of Deputies (Spain)
People's Party (Spain) politicians
Members of the Cortes of Aragon
2020 deaths
Deaths from the COVID-19 pandemic in Spain